The University of Helsinki (abbreviated UH) is a public research university located in Helsinki, Finland since 1829, but founded in the city of Turku (in Swedish Åbo) in 1640 as the Royal Academy of Åbo, at that time part of the Swedish Empire. It is the oldest and largest university in Finland with the widest range of disciplines available. In 2020, around 31,600 students were enrolled in the degree programs of the university spread across 11 faculties and 11 research institutes.

As of 1 August 2005, the university complies with the harmonized structure of the Europe-wide Bologna Process and offers bachelor, master, licenciate, and doctoral degrees. Admission to degree programmes is usually determined by entrance examinations, in the case of bachelor's degrees, and by prior degree results, in the case of master and postgraduate degrees. Entrance is particularly selective (circa 15% of the yearly applicants are admitted). It has been ranked a top 100 university in the world according to the 2016 ARWU, QS and THE rankings.

The university is bilingual, with teaching by law provided both in Finnish and Swedish. Since Swedish, albeit an official language of Finland, is a minority language, Finnish is by far the dominating language at the university. Teaching in English is extensive throughout the university at master, licentiate, and doctoral levels, making it a de facto third language of instruction.

Remaining true to its traditionally strong Humboldtian ethos, the University of Helsinki places heavy emphasis on high-quality teaching and research of a top international standard. It is a member of various prominent international university networks, such as Europaeum, UNICA, the Utrecht Network, and is a founding member of the League of European Research Universities. The university has also received international financial support for global welfare; for example, in September 2021, the U.S. Department of Defense provided the university with more than four million euros in funding for the treatment of MYC genes and breast cancer.

History

Royal Academy of Åbo 1640–1828

The first predecessor of the university, The Cathedral School of Åbo, was presumably founded in 1276 for education of boys to become servants of the Church. As the university was founded in 1640 by Queen Christina of Sweden (1626–1689) in Turku (Sw. Åbo), as the Åbo Kungliga Akademi, the senior part of the school formed the core of the new university, while the junior year courses formed a grammar school. It was the third university founded in the Swedish Empire, following Uppsala University and the Academia Gustaviana in Dorpat (predecessor to the University of Tartu in Estonia).

Imperial Alexander University in Finland 1828–1919

The second period of the university's history covers the period when Finland was a Grand Duchy of the Russian Empire, from 1809 to 1917. As Finland became part of the Russian Empire in 1809, Emperor Alexander I expanded the university and allocated substantial funds to it. Following the Great Fire of Turku in 1827, higher education within the country was moved to Helsinki, the new administrative heart of the Grand Duchy, in 1828, and renamed the Imperial Alexander University in Finland in honour of the late benefactor of the university. In the capital the primary task of the university was to educate the Grand Duchy’s civil servants.

The university became a community subscribing to the new Humboldtian ideals of science and culture, studying humanity and its living environment by means of scientific methods. The new statutes of the university enacted in 1828 defined the task of the university as promoting the development of "the Sciences and Humanities within Finland and, furthermore, educating the youth for the service of the Emperor and the Fatherland".

The Alexander University was a centre of national life that promoted the birth of an independent Finnish State and the development of Finnish identity. The great men of 19th century Finland, Johan Vilhelm Snellman, Johan Ludvig Runeberg, Elias Lönnrot and Zachris Topelius, were all involved in the activities of the university. The university became a major center of Finnish cultural, political, and legal life in 19th century Finland, and became a remarkable primum mobile of the nationalist and liberal cultural movements, political parties, and student organisations.

In the 19th century university research changed from being collection-centred to being experimental, empirical, and analytical. The more scientific approach of the university led to specialisation and created new disciplines. As the scientific disciplines developed, Finland received ever more scholarly knowledge and highly educated people, some of whom entered rapidly evolving industry or the government.

University of Helsinki 1919–present

The third period of the university's history began with the creation of the independent Republic of Finland in 1917, and with the renaming of the university as the University of Helsinki. Once Finland gained her independence in 1917 the university was given a crucial role in building the nation state and, after World War II, the welfare state. Members of the academic community promoted the international relations of the new state and the development of its economic life. Furthermore, they were actively involved in national politics and the struggle for equality.

In the interwar period the university was the scene of a conflict between those who wanted to advance the usage of Finnish language in the university, to the detriment of Swedish and those who opposed such move. Geographer Väinö Tanner was one of the most vocal defenders of Swedish language usage. Swedish People's Party of Finland initiated a campaign collecting 153 914 signatures in defense of the Swedish language that were handed to the parliament and government in October 1934. On an international front academics from Denmark, Sweden, Norway and Iceland sent letters to the diplomatic representations of Finland in their respective countries warning about a weakening of the Nordic unity that would result from diminishing the role of Swedish in the University of Helsinki.

In the 20th century, scholarly research at the University of Helsinki reached the level of the European elite in many disciplines. This was manifested, among other things, by international recognitions granted to its professors, such as the Fields Medal received by the mathematician Lars Ahlfors (1936), the Nobel Prize in Chemistry granted to Professor A.I. Virtanen (1945) and the Nobel Prize in Medicine shared by Professor Ragnar Granit (1967). In the Continuation War the university was heavily damaged by bombs during a soviet air raid on 27 February 1944.

After World War II, university research focused on improving Finnish living conditions and supporting major changes in the structure of society and business. The university also contributed to the breakthrough of modern technology.

The progress of scientific development created many new disciplines and faculties at the University of Helsinki. At present the university comprises 11 faculties, 500 professors and almost 40,000 students. The university has established as its goal to further its position as one of Europe’s top multidisciplinary research universities.

In March 2014, two people were arrested and in June 2014 sentenced to prison for three years for plotting a mass murder at the university.

Organization

Faculties
The university is divided into eleven faculties. They are listed below in the official order used by the university, reflecting both the history of the university and the hierarchy of disciplines at the time when the university was established:
 Faculty of Theology (established 1640)
 Faculty of Law (established 1640)
 Faculty of Medicine (established 1640)
 Faculty of Arts (Faculty of Philosophy established 1640 and split 1852, independent Arts section 1863, independent faculty 1992)
 Faculty of Science (Faculty of Philosophy established 1640 and split 1852, independent Science section 1863, independent faculty 1992)
 Faculty of Pharmacy (Faculty of Philosophy established 1640, split from the Faculty of Science 2004)
 Faculty of Biological and Environmental Sciences (Faculty of Philosophy established 1640, split from the Faculty of Science 2004)
 Faculty of Educational Sciences (independent section 1974, independent faculty 1992, reorganized and renamed 2004, reorganized and renamed 2017)
 Faculty of Social Sciences (established 1945)
 Faculty of Agriculture and Forestry (established 1898, independent faculty 1924)
 Faculty of Veterinary Medicine (established as an independent college in 1945, incorporated into the University of Helsinki in 1995)

The university also has several independent institutes, such as research centres and libraries, the most notable of which are perhaps the National Library of Finland and Helsinki University Library. Helsinki Collegium for Advanced Studies is another independent institute within the University of Helsinki, an Institute for Advanced Study, which is modeled upon the Institute for Advanced Study in Princeton, New Jersey. Previous directors include Raimo Väyrynen (2002–2004) and Juha Sihvola (2004–2009).

Academics

University rankings
University of Helsinki is ranked at 82nd in the world by the 2021 Academic Ranking of World Universities published by Shanghai Jiao Tong University. According to the Times Higher Education World University Rankings for 2021, the University of Helsinki is ranked at 98th overall in the world. In 2014 THE–QS World University Rankings list, the University of Helsinki was ranked 67th.

International Master’s Degree Programmes
The University of Helsinki offers a wide range of master’s degree programmes, taught entirely in English. The scope of the programmes is 120 ECTS credits, completed with two years of full-time study. Some programmes are organised by the University of Helsinki along with other Finnish and foreign universities. All programmes comply with the national legislation governing university education and are, therefore, recognised globally.

Research

Research institutes within the university include the following:
 Aleksanteri Institute – A national centre of research, study and expertise pertaining to Russia and East Europe
 Christina Institute for Gender Studies
 Environmental Change Research Unit
 Erik Castrén Institute of International Law and Human Rights
 Helsinki Center of Economic Research (HECER) – A joint initiative of the University of Helsinki, the Helsinki School of Economics and the Hanken School of Economics
 Helsinki Institute for Information Technology (HIIT) – A joint research institute of the University of Helsinki and the Aalto University
 Helsinki Institute of Life Science (HiLIFE) - supports and coordinates life science research across the university. HiLIFE oversees three operative units:
 Institute of Biotechnology (BI)
 Finnish Institute for Molecular Medicine (FIMM)
 Neuroscience Center (NC)
 Helsinki Institute of Physics
 Rolf Nevanlinna Institute – Research institute of mathematics, computer science, and statistics

Campuses

The university is located on four main campuses. Originally, the entire university was located in the very centre of Helsinki, but due to the rapid growth of the university since the 1930s, premises have been built and acquired in other areas.

City Centre Campus
The historical City Centre Campus has been the hub of activity ever since the university moved from Turku to Helsinki in the early 19th century. The campus has a central location and reflects the architectural style of this part of the city. The university buildings in the city center house the Faculties of Theology, Law, Arts, Behavioural Sciences and Social Sciences plus administrative functions. Most of the buildings on the campus have a major architectural significance ranging from the dominating Neo-Classical, through the Jugendstil, to 20th century Modernism.

The City Centre Campus, extending around the historical centre of Helsinki, Senate Square, and Kruununhaka city district, is the administrative heart of the University of Helsinki and has the largest concentration of faculties in Helsinki.

After the Great Fire of Turku in 1827, Emperor Nicholas I ordered the Royal Academy of Turku be moved to the new capital city of the Grand Duchy of Finland, Helsinki, where the Imperial Alexander University in Finland began to operate the next year. Helsinki was to become Finland's window to the world; a European city to which the university belonged as an integral part. Carl Ludvig Engel, architect, was given the assignment of designing an Empire-style main building next to Senate Square, facing the Imperial Senate. The main building was completed in 1832. Thanks to the lessons learnt from the fire of Turku, the library was built separate from other premises. The library and several faculty buildings in the campus were also designed by Engel.

The main building as well as other buildings of the campus were badly damaged during the Soviet bombings in World War II but rebuilt after the war.

The plan concerning the concentration of university facilities dating back to the 1980s, aimed to achieve a closer unity between facilities. The City Centre Campus does not stand out from the rest of the urban environment but is a part of the city, in line with the old university tradition. The university facilities still form a functional and coherent whole, consisting not only of historically valuable buildings, but also of facilities for 20,000 students and 3,000 teachers and other staff.

Kumpula Campus
The Kumpula Campus, housing the Faculty of Science, is located four kilometers north from the centre of Helsinki near tram lines 6 and 8. The campus houses the Departments of Physics, Chemistry, Mathematics and Statistics, Computer Science, and Geosciences and Geography.

The university departments were located in Kumpula for the first time in 1978 when the City of Helsinki leased the area for the university. A planning competition for the city plan for the area was held a year earlier. In the 1980s, the Accelerator Laboratory of the Department of Physics was quarried into Kumpula rock and the construction of Kumpula Botanical Garden began in 1987. It was not, however, until the 1990s when the construction work proper began, transforming the area into a significant campus.

The Chemicum, the building housing the Department of Chemistry and VERIFIN (Finnish Institute for Verification of the Chemical Weapons Convention), and the Physicum, which provides facilities for physics, geology and geography are located on Kumpula campus surrounding a square named after the Finnish Nobel prize winner, A. I. Virtanen. Kumpula Campus Library is also located in the Physicum. The Kumpula Sports Centre is planned for the recreational use of both university staff and students and citizens of Helsinki alike. Completed in 2004, the Exactum provides facilities for seismology, computer science and mathematical subjects, as well as administrative services.

The campus comprises two main parts: the Botanical Garden, surrounding the old building stock of Kumpula manor and the modern new building stock located a couple of hundred metres north of the manor. The greenness of the area makes the dynamic campus stand out as a unique, distinctive complex. The campus offers study and research facilities for 6,000 students and 1,000 teachers. The Finnish Meteorological Institute moved to the area in 2005. That building is known as Dynamicum.

Meilahti Campus

The Meilahti Campus, with the Faculty of Medicine, is a part of the Meilahti Hospital District on the edge of the city centre. Just a few kilometres from the City Centre Campus, the Meilahti area has been transformed into a cradle of top research on medicine, 'Medilahti'. Established in the 1930s, the Women's Clinic was accompanied by Finland's leading hospital, Helsinki University Central Hospital (HUCH) in 1966. The same year saw the completion of facilities for theoretical subject departments on Haartmaninkatu street. The building is now being renovated and extended.

The latest completed facilities in the campus include the National Library of Health Sciences (Terkko) and the research and teaching centre Biomedicum that houses several research institutes including the Institute for Molecular Medicine Finland (FIMM), Neuroscience Center (NC), and Minerva Foundation Institute for Medical Research.

The Ruskeasuo premises, including the Department of Dentistry, Institute for Oral Health, Department of Public Health and Department of Forensic Medicine, also belong to the Meilahti campus. The Meilahti and Ruskeasuo areas form a close-knit complex providing a meeting place for medical education, international top-level research and nursing. The campus is a workplace for 2,000 students and 1,500 teachers.

Thanks to the years-long project to combine the teaching facilities of the Faculty of Medicine, Meilahti is now a functional unity of medicine and health care. The atmosphere in the campus inspires people in their studies, research and international co-operation.

Although the Meilahti campus is intertwined with the rest of Meilahti district, it succeeds in forming a clear-cut campus area with its hospital-type building stock.

Viikki Campus
The Viikki Campus is located in the semi-suburban greenspace of the Viikki area, some 8 kilometres north-east of the city centre. It houses the Faculties of Agriculture and Forestry, Biosciences, Veterinary Medicine and Pharmacy. It is an important concentration in the field of biosciences, even by European standards. Indeed, it is often called the bioscience campus or the "green campus".

In addition to biosciences, the campus is home to a wide range of other life science researchers and students in such fields as environmental science, veterinary medicine, food research and economics. Numerous international research groups also work on the Viikki Campus. The Viikki Campus is the location of four faculties, three independent research institutes (Institute of Biotechnology (BI), Natural Resources Institute Finland (LUKE) and Finnish Environment Institute (SYKE)) and the Viikki Science Library.

It also attracts an increasing number of businesses to the Helsinki Business and Science Park. The Finnish Game and Fisheries Research Institute and the Finnish Food Safety Authority, Evira, have also moved to Viikki and negotiations are under way to relocate MTT Agrifood Research Finland to Viikki to complement the Department of Economics and Management.

The Viikki Campus unites a multidisciplinary science community of more than 6,500 students and 1,600 teachers, a residential area emphasising ecological values and the natural surroundings, including recreational areas and nature reserves, and forms a unique whole. The campus also has the Viikinlahti conservation area, which is particularly popular among bird watchers.

Libraries and museums

The National Library of Finland

The National Library of Finland is the foremost research library in Finland and the main branch of the University of Helsinki's library system. The National Library of Finland is the oldest and largest scholarly library in Finland as well as one of the largest independent institutes at the University of Helsinki. It is responsible for the collection, description, preservation and accessibility of Finland’s printed national heritage and the unique collections under its care. The National Library also serves as a national service and development centre for the library sector and promotes national and international cooperation in the field.

The Helsinki University Main Library

The Main Library of the university is used by students for research and studying. Located a few blocks down the street from the university's main building in the city center, the new Main Library was opened in 2012 in the Kaisa House. The new library merged the undergraduate library and four dispersed faculty libraries of the city center campus to a collection of approximately 1.5 million books. The architecture of the new building, designed by Anttinen Oiva Architects, has been praised and received several awards.

The Helsinki University Museum
The Helsinki University Museum is the museum of the University of Helsinki and was located until June 2014 on Snellmanninkatu off the north-east corner of Senate Square. Museums main exhibition moved to the University Main Building in 2015.

Helsinki University Museum was established in 2003 by merging the former University Museum specialising in the history of the University of Helsinki, the Museum of Medical History, the Museum of the History of Veterinary Medicine, the Museum of the History of Dentistry and the Collections of Craft Science. To complement the new conglomeration of museums, the Mineral Cabinet, which today belongs to the Finnish Museum of Natural History, returned to its original location in the Arppeanum building. Each year the museum also holds one or two temporary exhibitions in a specially designed area. Museums exhibition in Arppeanum Building was closed in June 2014. New main exhibition was opened in the Main Building in March 2015.

The University Museum is in charge of the preservation and conservation of the university’s valuable museum collections and property: old tuition and research equipment, furniture and works of art. The museum maintains an index register of all valuables that are kept in the facilities of the university. The museum also provides library, archive and photographic services pertaining to the history of the university and the history of medical science.

Finnish Museum of Natural History

The Finnish Museum of Natural History is a research institution under the University of Helsinki. It is responsible for the national botanical, zoological, geological and paleontological collections consisting of samples from around the world. The collections serve scientific, public informational and educational purposes.

Student life

Student Union

The Student Union of the University of Helsinki (Helsingin yliopiston ylioppilaskunta, HYY) was founded in 1868. It currently has 32,000 members and is one of the world's wealthiest student organizations, with assets of several hundred million euros. Among other things, it owns a good deal of property in the city centre of Helsinki. The union has been at the centre of student politics from the 19th Century nationalist movements, through the actions of the New Left in the 1960s, up to the present. Its governing assembly consists of parties which are connected to faculty organisations, the Student Nations, and the mainstream political parties.

Student nations
The student nations are student organisations that provide extra-curricular activities to students. Along with the faculty-based organisations, the nations provide one of the main nodes of student social life. The nations at University of Helsinki have a special legal status in the Universities Act. There are 15 nations at the university, each one representing a historic region or province of Finland, with four of these representing Swedish-speaking regions.  Membership is optional.

Notable alumni, faculty, and staff

Chancellors 
The chancellor is the highest representative of the University of Helsinki. He is elected by the college, the highest body of staff representation at the university. According to the University Act, the chancellor's task is to promote the sciences and monitor the interests of the university. The chancellor has the right to attend meetings of the Government of Finland on matters concerning the University of Helsinki.

Rectors

See also
 History of Finland
 Helsinki Senate Square
 List of universities in Finland
 Education in Finland
 Helsinki University of Technology
 Europaeum
 Bologna Process

References

External links

 University of Helsinki – Official site
 Presentation of premises – Images of almost all university buildings and their lecture rooms

 
Helsinki, University of
Helsinki
Neoclassical architecture in Finland
Universities and colleges in Finland
1640 establishments in Sweden